Grays Creek is an  stream in the U.S. state of Virginia.  It is a tributary of the James River, rising south of State Route 626 and flowing east to reach the James River southwest of Historic Jamestowne, across the river.

See also
List of rivers of Virginia

References

USGS Hydrologic Unit Map - State of Virginia (1974)

Rivers of Virginia
Tributaries of the James River
Rivers of Prince George County, Virginia
Rivers of Richmond, Virginia